Garik Israelian (born 1963) is an Armenian-Spanish astrophysicist who is co-founder of the Starmus Festival. In 1999, Israelian and colleagues presented the first observational evidence that supernova explosions are responsible for the formation of stellar-mass black holes.

Early life and education

Garik Israelyan Shatinyan was born in 1963 in Yerevan in then-Soviet Armenia. Preferring music over studying, he quit school at the age of 16, playing rock guitar in bars. Israelian credits sci-fi film Solaris for piquing his interest in science fiction and inspiring him to go to university. He studied astrophysics under Viktor Ambartsumian at Yerevan State University, graduating in 1987 and completing his Ph.D. in 1992. After a brief stint with an observatory in Northern Ireland and fellowships in Netherlands and Australia, his final fellowship settled him in the Canary Islands in 1997 where he stayed and obtained Spanish citizenship.

Career
Israelian has worked at the Institute of Astrophysics, Canary Islands (IAC) since 1997. In 1999, Israelian and colleagues found the first observational evidence, based on data from the W. M. Keck Observatory, that supernova explosions are responsible for the formation of black holes.

In 2001, he proposed the "Lithium-6 test" to determine if a star has engulfed a planet or other gaseous or solid matter.

In 2009, he and colleagues discovered that stars with planets, such as the sun, tend to have much less lithium.

Starsounds and Starmus 

In 2005, Israelian compiled a library of acoustic sound waves produced within the bodies of stars. In 2013, Brian May and the band Tangerine Dream used the starsounds in their composition Supernovae, and in 2016 Brian Eno arranged some of Israelian's star recordings into a composition titled Starsounds.

In 2011, together with astrophysicist and musician Brian May, Israelian and May created Starmus, a festival that would bring together the stars and music. The concept of the Starsounds project was explained in Israelian's lecture "Our Acoustic Universe" at the first Starmus Festival and published in 2014 in the book Starmus: 50 Years of Man in Space.

Awards
In 2010, Michel Mayor, Israelian, and Nuno Santos were awarded the Viktor Ambartsumian International Prize "[f]or their important contribution in the study of relation between planetary systems and their host stars."

In 2014, Israelian received The Canary Islands Gold Medal, awarded by the government of the Canary Islands.

On 20 June 2016, the International Astronomical Union and the Minor Planet Center officially renamed asteroid (21057) 1991 GJ8 to Garikisraelian in honor of Israelian.

References

External links
 Instituto de Astrofísica de Canarias
 

1963 births
Living people
Scientists from Yerevan
Armenian astrophysicists
Armenian emigrants to Spain
Spanish astrophysicists
Yerevan State University alumni
Spanish people of Armenian descent